"You Are So Beautiful" is a song written by Billy Preston and Bruce Fisher that was first released in 1974 on Preston's ninth studio album, The Kids & Me. It was also the B-side of his single "Struttin'". Later that same year, English singer Joe Cocker released a slower version of the song on his album I Can Stand a Little Rain. Cocker's version was produced by Jim Price, and released as a single in November 1974. It became Cocker's highest charting solo hit, peaking at number five on the United States' Billboard Hot 100 (Cocker's biggest hit on the pop chart was "Up Where We Belong", a duet with Jennifer Warnes from the 1982 film An Officer And A Gentleman, which reached number 1), and at number four on Canada's Top Singles chart.

Some sources credit Dennis Wilson of the Beach Boys with contributing to the song's genesis. Wilson performed the song live with the Beach Boys from the late 1970s onwards. Kenny Rankin, Ray Stevens, Kenny Rogers, Bonnie Tyler and Brian Kennedy are also among the artists who have covered "You Are So Beautiful". The song has also been featured in numerous movies, television shows, and ads.

Background
Billy Preston wrote "You Are So Beautiful" with one of his regular collaborators, Bruce Fisher. Preston's inspiration was his mother, who worked as a stage actress. According to his friend Sam Moore (who had assumed it was a standard love song), Preston was appalled to learn that Moore was using the song as a means to attract young women each time he sang it in concert. In Moore's description, Preston told him: "That song's about my mother!" The composition incorporates part of Preston's 1969 song "Let Us All Get Together (Right Now)", which he wrote with soul singer Doris Troy.

According to Beach Boys biographer Jon Stebbins, although Dennis Wilson is not credited as a writer, he helped Preston finish writing "You Are So Beautiful". Preston and Wilson are said to have collaborated on the song while attending a party where they discussed the concept of beauty. In the opinion of Craig Hlavaty, writing for Houston Press, while Wilson never sought to claim a share of the song's authorship, "If you check out Wilson's solo work, you can hear where Wilson's mind took over 'Beautiful.'"

Billy Hinsche, close friend of and sideman with the Beach Boys, stated that he was at the party and witnessed Preston and Wilson working on the song "out of the corner of my ear and the corner of my eye". He said that he was unaware of how much of the song Preston had already written prior to Wilson's involvement. "Maybe it was just his [Wilson's] interpretation of the song. Later Dennis said to me, 'Well, you know, I helped write that song.'" In a 2004 interview, when asked whether his brother Dennis was "one of the uncredited writers" of "You Are So Beautiful", Brian Wilson said: "He did not write that song."

Dennis sang "You Are So Beautiful" as an encore at Beach Boys shows intermittently from 1975 until his death in 1983. A live rendition, circa 1978, and an edited 1983 live rendition both appear in the film The Beach Boys: An American Band (1985). A live version was released on the group's album Good Timin': Live at Knebworth England 1980 in 2002.

Composition
"You Are So Beautiful" was originally published in the key of A♭ major in common time with a tempo of 70 beats per minute. Cocker's vocals span from B♭2 to E♭4. The song is unusual in that the chord progression does not include the "V" chord.

Critical reception
Marc Lee of The Daily Telegraph noted the song's contemplative beginning, accompanied only by piano, followed by "lush strings" which "sweep in and carry [Cocker] off into passionate ecstasies". Lee commented that the song, one of Cocker's best-known works, was a good example of Cocker's ability to be both gentle and "gloriously stirring".

Live performances
Cocker performed the song along with Ray Charles in a 1983 television tribute to Charles, A Man and his Soul.

Personnel
Joe Cocker – lead vocals
Nicky Hopkins – piano
Dave McDaniel – bass
Jimmy Webb – arrangements

Charts

Weekly charts

Year-end charts

Certifications

Other renditions 
 Ray Stevens recorded it for his album Just for the Record (1976). Stevens' version reached number 16 on the Hot Country Songs charts.
 Bob James covered this song on his album Heads (1977).
 Tanya Tucker recorded it for her compilation album You Are So Beautiful (album) released in June, 1977 where it rose to #40 on the Country and Western chart.
 Kenny Rankin recorded it on The Kenny Rankin Album (1977).
 Perry Como included the song on his album So It Goes (1983).
 Kenny Rogers recorded the song as the closing track on his best-selling album We've Got Tonight (1983). It was also used as the B-side to the single release of the title track.
 Welsh singer Bonnie Tyler recorded the song on her album Silhouette In Red (1993).
 Al Green recorded the song on his album Everything's OK (2005).
 Italian bluesman Zucchero Fornaciari included the cover of the song in his greatest hits album All the Best (2007).
 Irish singer Brian Kennedy covered the song on his album Interpretations (2008).
 Hong Kong singer Susan Wong included a cover of the song on her smooth jazz / bossa nova album 511 (2009).
 In 2016 former Isley Brother Chris Jasper covered the song on his album Share With Me.

In other media
Television programs have used commercial recordings of the song. Seventies-themed sitcom The Wonder Years used a recorded version of the song in Season 6, Episode 16, "Nose", where it played at the end of the episode at a school dance where Kevin's friend Ricky loses a girl with a large nose just as Ricky had come to appreciate her. 
Joe Cocker's version was used on Episode 24, Season 11 (Only Just Began) of Knots Landing in a montage in which a drunk Danny Waleska ends up hitting Pat Williams with his car. 
The song was heard in Two and a Half Men Season 4, Episode 23, ("Anteaters. They're Just Crazy-Lookin'"), sung by guest Enrique Iglesias.
An episode of Home Improvement ("Jill's Birthday") accompanied the song with a montage of photos of Jill Taylor (Patricia Richardson) in her early age. 
The song played in Season 5, Episode 9 of Full House.
The film Modern Romance (1981) includes an instrumental version of the song in its opening and closing titles, and also uses Joe Cocker's version to underscore its final scene. 
Joe Cocker's version  was also used in the film Carlito's Way (1993) and plays during Gail's apartment scene and over the film's end credits.
In the American comedy movie The Little Rascals (1994), the song is sung by Alfalfa to Darla on a boat.
The song was comically sung by Seann William Scott in the 2001 film Evolution. His character, Wayne, did so in a mall to get the attention of an alien terrorizing the customers, much to the dismay of his two acquaintances, Ira Kane (David Duchovny) and Harry Block (Orlando Jones).
In Mike and Dave Need Wedding Dates, Dave and Mike sing the song in Jeanie and Eric's Wedding.
In 2016, the song appears in the season one finale of Quantico entitled "Yes", first sung by a drunk Caleb Haas (Graham Rogers) and Brandon Fletcher (Jacob Artist) celebrating their graduation, then leading into the Joe Cocker version for the remainder of the scene.
The song appears in a 2018 TV commercial for Toyota.
 In The Simpsons season 2 episode "Simpson and Delilah," a singing telegram employee serenades Marge with the song when Homer forgets their anniversary. At the end, when Homer loses all the hair he grew with no way of growing it back, Marge tenderly sings it to him in bed.
 In The Boys, as The Deep hallucinates that his gills are speaking (with Patton Oswalt's voice), they start singing the song, and he eventually goes along.
 In The Walking Dead season 10 episode "Here's Negan", Negan plays the song throughout the special, talking about how it was his wife Lucille's favorite.

References

1974 songs
1975 singles
Billy Preston songs
A&M Records singles
Songs written by Billy Preston
Songs written by Bruce Fisher
Joe Cocker songs
MCA Records singles
Ray Stevens songs
The Beach Boys songs
Bonnie Tyler songs
Tanya Tucker songs
Song recordings produced by Rob Fraboni